The Furious Masters is a  science fiction novel by Margot Bennett. Published in 1968, it was Bennett's second work of science fiction and her final novel.

Plot
The calm existence of the small Yorkshire town of Higherfield is shattered when a strange spacecraft crashes nearby. Whilst an avalanche of publicity sweeps in, events take a sinister turn when one of the discoverers of the object becomes insane, and riots and hysteria begin to sweep the country, to the great consternation of the previously unconcerned Prime Minister, who soon finds himself in the thick of the conundrum.

Availability
The novel was published in Dutch in 1970, as Bacillen in Infrarood. The novel is no longer in print.

After

The novel made little impact. Although Bennett lived for another twelve years, she published nothing further.

References

1968 British novels
Scottish science fiction novels
1968 science fiction novels
Novels by Margot Bennett
Eyre & Spottiswoode books
Novels set in Yorkshire